The Mahanadi razorbelly minnow (Salmostoma untrahi) is a species of ray-finned fish in the genus Salmostoma.

References 

 

Salmostoma
Fish described in 1869
Taxobox binomials not recognized by IUCN